Caloocan's 2nd congressional district, also known as South Caloocan district, is one of the three congressional districts of the Philippines in the city of Caloocan. It has been represented in the House of Representatives of the Philippines since 1987. The district consists of the entire South Caloocan barangays south of Circumferential Road 4 (including EDSA): Barangays 5 to 76 in Zones 1 to 7 and Barangays 86 to 131 in Zones 8 to 11. It is currently represented in the 19th Congress by Mary Mitzi Cajayon-Uy of PDP-Laban.

Representation history

Election results

2022

2019

2016

2013

2010

See also
Legislative districts of Caloocan

References

Congressional districts of the Philippines
Politics of Caloocan
1987 establishments in the Philippines
Congressional districts of Metro Manila
Constituencies established in 1987